This is Paradise!: My North Korean Childhood is the autobiographical account of Hyok Kang, who describes his childhood in Onsong, North Korea in the 1980s and 1990s, his escape into China in 1998, his journey through southeast Asia, and his life in South Korea.

The book was originally published in France in 2004, with the title "Ici, C'est Le Paradis!: Une enfance en Coree du Nord".

See also
Human rights in North Korea
North Korean literature

References

Human rights abuses in North Korea
Political books
Political repression in North Korea
Books about North Korea